Querbes is a surname, possibly related to the hamlet of Querbes in Asprières, Aveyron, France.

Notable people with this surname include:

 Andrew Querbes (1864-1939), American banker
 Louis Querbes (1793–1859), French priest

See also
 Asprières, Aveyron, Occitanie, France